Bani Ahmed Wathalth is a sub-district located in Far Al Udayn District, Ibb Governorate, Yemen. Bani Ahmed Wathalth had a population of 11160 according to the 2004 census.

References 

Sub-districts in Far Al Udayn District